Coin is a surname. Notable people with the surname include:

 Christophe Coin (born 1958), French cellist, viola da gamba player, and conductor
 Julie Coin (born 1982), French tennis player
 Robert Coin (1901–2007), French sculptor and engraver